The eighth season of the Naruto: Shippuden anime series is directed by Hayato Date, and produced by Pierrot and TV Tokyo. The eighth season aired from March to August 2010. The season follows the Akatsuki leader Pain invading the Leaf Village and attempting to kidnap Naruto Uzumaki. Aniplex released the six volumes between October 7, 2010 and March 2, 2011. While the volumes contains all the episodes, episodes 170 and 171 were skipped to the sixth volume.

The English dub of this season premiered on February 16 on Neon Alley and concluded on March 30, 2013. The season would make its English television debut on Adult Swim's Toonami programming block and premiere from April 2 to October 1, 2017.

The fourth feature film, Naruto Shippuden The Movie: The Lost Tower was released on July 31, 2010. The broadcast versions of episodes 172 to 175 include scenes from the film in the opening themes, while still retaining the music "Tōmei Datta Sekai".


Episode list

Home releases

Japanese

English

References

General
 
 

2010 Japanese television seasons
Shippuden Season 08

Specific